Mycerinodes puerilis is a species of beetle in the family Cerambycidae. It was described by Kolbe in 1894.

References

Morimopsini
Beetles described in 1894